This is a list of notable Dominican Americans, including both original immigrants who obtained American citizenship and their American descendants.

To be included in this list, the person must have a Wikipedia article showing they are Dominican American or must have references showing they are Dominican American and are notable.

List

Actors 

 Juan Fernández de Alarcon – Dominican actor
 Rose Abdoo – American actress and comedian. She is of Dominican and Lebanese descent (Gilmore Girls, That's So Raven).
 Tina Aumont (1946–2006) – actress
 Lourdes Benedicto – actress of Filipino/Dominican Republic descent
 Elvis Nolasco – American actor of Dominican descent, American Crime
 Vladimir Caamaño – Dominican-American actor and stand-up comedian
 Rafael Campos – Dominican born, American raised actor
 Francis Capra – actor of Dominican and Italian descent
 Aimee Carrero – Dominican born actress
 Hosea Chanchez – also credited as Hosea, actor (For Your Love)
 Jackie Cruz – Dominican-American actress
 Angel Curiel – Dominican-American actor, FX's Pose
 Rhenzy Feliz – American actor of Dominican descent, Marvel's Runaways
 Jason Genao – American actor of Dominican descent, Netflix's On My Block
  Rick Gonzalez – actor of Dominican and Puerto Rican descent; known as Timo Cruz in the film Coach Carter, and as Ben Gonzalez on the television series Reaper
 Wilson Jermaine Heredia – actor known for his portrayal of Angel Dumott Schunard in the Broadway musical Rent; parents are Dominicans
 Jharrel Jerome – Emmy Award-winning actor born to a Dominican mother and African-American father; he is the first Afro-Latino to win an Emmy and the first Dominican to have been nominated.
 Jorge Lendeborg Jr. – Dominican born actor, with supporting credits in Love, Simon, Alita: Battle Angel, and the male lead in Bumblebee
 Selenis Leyva – American actress of Cuban and Dominican descent (Orange Is the New Black, Diary of a Future President). 
 Judy Marte – Dominican-American actress and producer
 Mirtha Michelle – American actress of Dominican descent
 Anthony Mendez – Dominican-American voice actor
 Carlos de la Mota – Dominican actor
 Patricia Mota – American actress and film producer, of Dominican descent
 Maria Montez (1912–1951) – Dominican-born motion picture actress
 Miguel A. Núñez, Jr. – actor (The Return of the Living Dead, Life and a leading role in Juwanna Mann); of Dominican and Puerto Rican parents
 Karen Olivo – stage and television actress; of Puerto Rican, Native American, Dominican and Chinese descent
 Alex Paez – American actor of Dominican descent
 Carlos PenaVega – film and TV actor, singer-songwriter, dancer and television show host; father is of Spanish and Venezuelan descent, mother is of Dominican descent
 Manny Pérez – Dominican actor
 Dascha Polanco – Dominican-American actress, Netflix's Orange is the New Black
  Dania Ramírez – Dominican-born American TV and film actress (Entourage, Heroes and The Sopranos)
 Silvestre Rasuk – actor of Dominican descent
 Victor Rasuk – actor, Dominican parents
 Monica Raymund – stage performer and actress (Chicago Fire and Lie to Me); her mother is from the Dominican Republic
 Alisa Reyes – actress (All That); of Dominican, Irish, Italian and Caribbean Indian descent
 Judy Reyes – actress (Scrubs)
 Aida Rodriguez – comedian, actress, producer and writer, of Puerto Rican and Dominican descent
 Michelle Rodríguez – actress known for her role as Ana Lucia Cortez in the television series Lost; her father is Puerto Rican and mother is Dominican
 Nelson de la Rosa (1968–2006) – one of the shortest men of the 20th and 21st centuries; actor from the Dominican Republic; lived and died in Rhode Island
 Zoe Saldana – American actress of Dominican, Haitian and Puerto Rican descent
 Merlin Santana (1976–2002) – television and film actor; of Dominican descent
 Shannon Tavarez (1999–2010) – child actress; of African American and Dominican descent
 Julian Scott Urena – actor; immigrated with his family to New York City while in grade school
 Denise Vasi – fashion model and soap opera actress
 James Victor – Dominican-born American actor (Viva Valdez, Zorro)
 Tristan Wilds – actor (The Wire and 90210); of African American (father) and African-American, Irish, and Dominican (mother) descent

Singers and musicians 

 40 Cal. – rapper, member of Harlem-based hip-hop group The Diplomats
 Jhené Aiko – singer-songwriter; Her mother is of Spanish, Dominican and Japanese descent 
 Antonio Fresco – American DJ of Dominican and Puerto Rican descent.
 AraabMuzik – hip hop record producer, of Dominican and Guatemalan descent
 Arcángel – singer-songwriter, rapper and actor; parents are Dominicans
 AZ – American rapper
Bryan Bautista – singer and contestant from NBC's The Voice season 9; of Dominican and Puerto Rican descent
 Carlos & Alejandra – Latin music group focusing on the genre of bachata
 Cardi B – Dominican American  Grammy winner Best Rap Album rapper who made number one on Billboard Hot 100 due to her popular single Bodak Yellow
Michel Camilo – Grammy Award winner Dominican born jazz pianist and composer
Damirón – pianist and composer
Casandra Damirón – Dominican singer and dancer
Natti Natasha – singer-songwriter born in Santiago de los Caballeros, Dominican Republic.
 DaniLeigh – Dominican American singer 
Pop Smoke (1999-2020) – American Rapper of Dominican heritage on his mother's side. 
 Yasmin Deliz – singer-songwriter, model and actress of Dominican and Colombian and Venezuelan heritage; Dominican father, Colombian and Venezuelan mother
 Kat DeLuna – Dominican American pop singer
 Dave East – American rapper of Dominican and Bajan descent
 Euro – Dominican born American raised rapper signed to Lil Wayne's record label Young Money Entertainment
 Fabolous – rapper of Dominican and African American descent
 Fuego – Dominican-American merengue singer-songwriter, composer
 Fulanito – Dominican-American musical group
 Irv Gotti – hip hop and R&B record producer
 Ivan Barias – Grammy nominated music producer and songwriter
 Leslie Grace – Dominican-American singer-songwriter and actress debuting in the film adaptation of In The Heights
 Mila J – singer, rapper, dancer; Jhené Aiko's sister
 Jumz – rapper
 Magic Juan – Dominican American merengue hip hop artist who is considered the "Godfather" of the merengue hip-hop genre when he created it as the lead vocalist for Proyecto Uno in the 1990s before becoming a solo artist after 2001.
 Johnny Marines – member of the Latin American group Aventura
 Melanie Martinez – singer-songwriter 
 Ralph Mercado (1941–2009) – promoter of Latin American music who established a network of businesses; of Puerto Rican and Dominican descent
 Chep Nuñez (1964–1990) – Dominican born American raised music producer, editor, and mixer
 Karina Pasian – Grammy Award-nominated recording artist and pianist; of Dominican and Armenian descent
 Prince Royce – singer-songwriter and record producer; of Dominican descent
 Lizette Santana – recording artist, singer-songwriter, musician, record producer and actress
 Roger Sanchez – house music DJ
 Juelz Santana – rapper, producer, actor and member of group Dipset; of African American and Dominican descent; at age twelve started duo Draft Pick, which was signed to Priority Records
 Lenny Santos – former member of the bachata group Aventura
 Max Santos – bass player of the bachata group Aventura
 Romeo Santos – singer, featured composer and former lead singer of the Bachata group Aventura; of Puerto Rican and Dominican descent
 Ice Spice – rapper
 Saucy Santana - rapper
 Giselle Tavera – Dominican born, American raised singer
 Michael Tavera – American composer of Dominican descent best known for his animation scores
 Trina – rapper, songwriter and model; father is of Dominican origin
 Jamila Velazquez – American singer and actress of Dominican and Puerto Rican descent
 JR Writer – American rapper
 Ugly God – SoundCloud rapper of Dominican and African-American descent

Models 
 Julissa Bermudez – model and former television host on 106 & Park
 Susie Castillo – former beauty queen who held the Miss USA title and competed in the Miss Teen USA and Miss Universe pageants; of Puerto Rican and Dominican descent
 Adriana Diaz – beauty queen from New York City who has competed in the Miss USA and Miss Teen USA pageants
 Sessilee Lopez – American model; of Dominican and Portuguese descent
 Erica Mena – hip hop model and television personality on Love & Hip Hop
 Christina Mendez – plus-size model from New York City
 Alexis Skyy – television personality and hip hop model of Dominican and Jamaican descent

Sport 

 Felipe Alou – former Dominican-American outfielder and manager in Major League Baseball
 Jesús Alou – former Dominican-American outfielder in Major League Baseball
 Matty Alou – former Dominican-American outfielder in Major League Baseball
 Moisés Alou – former Dominican-American outfielder in Major League Baseball who played for 17 seasons in the National League
 Pedro Alvarez – Dominican born, American raised professional baseball third baseman with the Pittsburgh Pirates of Major League Baseball
 Trevor Ariza – American professional basketball player in the National Basketball Association
 Ronnie Belliard – retired Major League Baseball second baseman, of Dominican descent
 Julio Borbon – Major League Baseball center fielder for the Texas Rangers
 Luis Castillo – defensive end for the San Diego Chargers of the National Football League
 Stalin Colinet – former defensive tackle/defensive end in the NFL
 Manny Delcarmen – former professional baseball pitcher for the New York Yankees organization; has been called "The Pride of Hyde Park"
 Mary Joe Fernández – former professional tennis player
 Luis García – MLB infielder born in New York City
 Fernando Guerrero – Dominican boxer living in the US since a child
 Al Horford – Dominican professional basketball player
 Mark Jackson – retired professional basketball player and former head coach of the Golden State Warriors;  father is Dominican
 Neil Magny – mixed martial artist; competes in the Welterweight division of the UFC
 Pedro Martínez – Dominican-American professional baseball player 
 Sammy Mejia – Dominican American professional basketball player
 Diomedes Olivo – Dominican American retired Major League Baseball player
 David Ortiz – Dominican-American professional baseball player with the Boston Red Sox
 Plácido Polanco – Dominican born Major League Baseball player, plays for the Philadelphia Phillies and has also played for the St. Louis Cardinals and Detroit Tigers; in 2008, he became a naturalized American citizen
 Albert Pujols –  Dominican-American professional baseball first baseman for the St. Louis Cardinals of Major League Baseball
 Hanley Ramírez – professional baseball shortstop and first baseman for the Boston Red Sox, Miami Marlins, Los Angeles Dodgers, and Cleveland Indians
 Manny Ramirez – professional baseball outfielder and designated hitter; currently a free agent; Dominican born, American raised 
 Tutan Reyes – free agent football guard in the NFL
 Alex Rodriguez – former professional baseball third baseman with the New York Yankees of Major League Baseball; parents are Dominican
 Gilberto Rondón – retired Major League Baseball pitcher
 Dante Rosario – father is Dominican, mother is from the US
 Eddie Sanchez – mixed martial arts (MMA) fighter; of Mexican and Dominican descent
 Félix Sánchez – track and field athlete who specializes in the 400 meter hurdles; of Dominican parents
 Carlos Santana − professional baseball first baseman and catcher for the Cleveland Indians and Philadelphia Phillies
 Pedro Sosa – football offensive tackle for the Hartford Colonials of the United Football League
 Sammy Sosa – Dominican former professional baseball right fielder; played with four Major League Baseball teams over his career, which spanned from 1989–2007
 Karl-Anthony Towns – Dominican-American professional basketball player with the Minnesota Timberwolves, who selected him first overall in the 2015 NBA draft; African American father, Dominican mother
 Charlie Villanueva – Dominican-American professional basketball player with the Detroit Pistons

Politicians 

 Shaun Abreu – member of the New York City Council
 Marisol Alcantara – former member of the New York State Senate
Daisy Baez – former member of the Florida House of Representatives
Alex Blanco – former mayor of Passaic, New Jersey
Dennis Bradley – member of the Connecticut State Senate
 Fernando Cabrera – former member of the New York City Council
 Nelson Castro – former member of the New York State Assembly
 Lorraine Cortés-Vázquez – former Secretary of State of New York
 Marcos Devers – member of the Massachusetts House of Representatives
 Carmen De La Rosa – member of the New York City Council
 Grace Diaz – member of the from Rhode Island House of Representatives and former acting chair of the Rhode Island Democratic Party
 Adriano Espaillat – member of the United States House of Representatives for New York's 13th congressional district
 Rafael Espinal – former member of the New York City Council and New York State Assembly
 Antonio Felipe – member of the Connecticut House of Representatives
 Julissa Ferreras – member of the New York City Council
 William Lantigua – former Mayor of Lawrence, Massachusetts (born and raised in the Dominican Republic)
 Guillermo Linares – former member of the New York State Assembly
 Miguel Martinez – former New York City Council member from Council District 10 in Upper Manhattan, New York City
 Juana Matias – former member of the Massachusetts House of Representatives
 Joseline Peña-Melnyk – member of the Maryland House of Delegates
 Cesar A. Perales – former Secretary of State of New York
 Thomas Perez – former Democratic National Committee Chairman and United States Attorney General; 2022 Maryland gubernatorial candidate (parents are Dominicans)
 Julissa Reynoso Pantaleón – United States Ambassador to Spain and Andorra 
 Ydanis Rodríguez – former member of the New York City Council
 Pierina Sanchez – member of the New York City Council
 Angel Taveras –  former mayor of Providence, Rhode Island (of Dominican descent, first Hispanic mayor of the city)

Artists 
 Clara Ledesma (1924–1999) – painter from the Dominican Republic; lived last years of her life in New York
 Tania Marmolejo (born 1975) – painter from the Dominican Republic; Dominican born, American naturalized 
 Olivia Peguero  (born 1963) – Dominican Republic painter, known for documenting the landscapes of the undeveloped Dominican countryside and the Arte Libros Foundation

Writers 

 Julia Alvarez – poet, novelist, and essayist
Josefina Baez – storyteller, writer, performer, theater director, educator
 Fernando Cabrera – National Poetry and Literary Essay Prize winner
 Angie Cruz – novelist
 Junot Díaz – writer, creative writing professor at MIT, and fiction editor at Boston Review; Dominican born, American naturalized
 Rhina Espaillat – bilingual Dominican-born, American raised poet
 Daisy Cocco De Filippis – writer and educator
 Ana-Maurine Lara – novelist, poet and black feminist scholar 
 Nelly Rosario – novelist and creative writing instructor in the MFA Program at Texas State University in San Marcos

Other personalities 

 Ed Boon – Chicagan co-creator and creative director of the acclaimed Mortal Kombat video games
 Rolando Acosta – Dominican associate justice of the New York Appellate Division of the Supreme Court, First Judicial Department
 Santi Deoleo – Dominican born radio producer, personality, and fashion designer also known as "Krazy Kulo"
 Rudy Duthil – advertising executive of Cuban and Dominican descent
 Benny Medina – American musician producer to Dominican parents.
 Christina Mendez – New York City-based plus-size model and entertainment personality
 The Kid Mero – comedian
 Francisco Moncion – Dominican born ballet dancer, choreographer and charter member of the New York City Ballet
 Providencia Paredes – personal assistant to the First Lady of the US Jacqueline Kennedy Onassis> 
 Jose Pimentel – also known as Muhammad Yusuf; Dominican born naturalized US citizen arrested on November 20, 2011 by the New York City Police Department for allegedly plotting to bomb New York City
 Danielle Polanco – dancer and choreographer; Dominican-Puerto Rican American
 Óscar de la Renta – Dominican born fashion designer
 Julissa Reynoso – New York City attorney born in the Dominican Republic; American Ambassador to Uruguay since 2012 
 Rosanna Tavarez – entertainment reporter and television presenter
 Jessy Terrero – Dominican film and music video director
 Carmen Wong Ulrich – television and online journalist; personal finance expert at CNBC
 Ramona M. Valdez (1984–2005) – U.S. Marine

In Fiction 
 Luz Noceda – 14-year-old cartoon character, first bisexual lead character and first lead character in a lesbian relationship on a Disney Channel show

See also 

 Dominican American
 Dominican people
 List of people from the Dominican Republic

References 

Bibliography

Dominica
American people of Dominican Republic descent
Dominican Americans
Dominican Republic